In mathematics, a Klein geometry is a type of geometry motivated by Felix Klein in his influential Erlangen program. More specifically, it is a homogeneous space X together with a transitive action on X by a Lie group G, which acts as the symmetry group of the geometry.

For background and motivation see the article on the Erlangen program.

Formal definition
A Klein geometry is a pair  where G is a Lie group and H is a closed Lie subgroup of G such that the (left) coset space G/H is connected. The group G is called the principal group of the geometry and G/H is called the space of the geometry (or, by an abuse of terminology, simply the Klein geometry). The space  of a Klein geometry is a smooth manifold of dimension
dim X = dim G − dim H.

There is a natural smooth left action of G on X given by

Clearly, this action is transitive (take ), so that one may then regard X as a homogeneous space for the action of G. The stabilizer of the identity coset  is precisely the group H.

Given any connected smooth manifold X and a smooth transitive action by a Lie group G on X, we can construct an associated Klein geometry  by fixing a basepoint x0 in X and letting H be the stabilizer subgroup of x0 in G. The group H is necessarily a closed subgroup of G and X is naturally diffeomorphic to G/H.

The Klein geometry associated to a homogeneous space X is then unique up to isomorphism (i.e. it is independent of the chosen basepoint x0).

Bundle description
Given a Lie group G and closed subgroup H, there is natural right action of H on G given by right multiplication.  This action is both free and proper. The orbits are simply the left cosets of H in G. One concludes that G has the structure of a smooth principal H-bundle over the left coset space G/H:

Types of Klein geometries

Effective geometries
The action of G on  need not be effective. The kernel of a Klein geometry is defined to be the kernel of the action of G on X. It is given by

The kernel K may also be described as the core of H in G (i.e. the largest subgroup of H that is normal in G). It is the group generated by all the normal subgroups of G that lie in H.

A Klein geometry is said to be effective if  and locally effective if K is discrete.

Geometrically oriented geometries
A Klein geometry  is geometrically oriented if G is connected. (This does not imply that G/H is an oriented manifold).

Reductive geometries

Examples 
In the following table, there is a description of the classical geometries, modeled as Klein geometries.

References

Differential geometry
Lie groups
Homogeneous spaces